Peter Shin is an American animator, director, and producer who served as supervising director of Stewie Griffin: The Untold Story, the director of Big Bug Man, the director of Family Guy episodes "Death Has a Shadow" (the series premiere), "Emission Impossible", "North by North Quahog",  "It's a Trap!" and "The Simpsons Guy" and was a character layout artist for The Simpsons for several episodes between 1990 and 1995.

He has also worked on the cartoon Freakazoid! and has directed several episodes of Duckman.

Shin won an Annie Award for directing the Family Guy episode "North by North Quahog". He has also been nominated for several Emmy Awards.

References

External links
 
 Official Family Guy Website on Fox

Living people
American film directors
American television directors
American artists of Korean descent
American film directors of Korean descent
Place of birth missing (living people)
Year of birth missing (living people)